The Raven Explorer I is an American autogyro that was designed and produced by Raven Rotorcraft of Boulder Colorado and later El Prado, New Mexico, introduced in the 1990s. Now out of production, when it was available the aircraft was supplied as a kit, for amateur construction.

The Explorer I is no longer available as the company has moved to develop the two-seat Raven Rotor-Plane.

Design and development
The Explorer I was designed as a low-cost utilitarian autogyro. It features a single main rotor, a single-seat open cockpit without a windshield and conventional landing gear. A cockpit fairing was a factory option.

The aircraft fuselage is made from a combination of welded 4130 steel tube and bolted-together aluminum tubing.

The manufacturer estimated the construction time from the supplied kit as 100 hours.

Specifications (Explorer I)

See also
List of rotorcraft

References

External links

Photo of a Raven Explorer I

Explorer I
1990s United States sport aircraft
1990s United States ultralight aircraft
1990s United States civil utility aircraft
Homebuilt aircraft
Single-engined tractor autogyros